Nevada Solar One is a concentrated solar power plant, with a nominal capacity of 64 MW and maximum steam turbine power output up to 72 MW net (75 MW gross), spread over an area of . The projected CO2 emissions avoided is equivalent to taking approximately 20,000 cars off the road. The project required an investment of $266 million USD, and the project officially went into operation in June 2007. Electricity production is estimated to be 134 GWh (gigawatt hours) per year.

In 2007, when the plant came on line, it was the second solar thermal energy (STE) power plant built in the United States in more than 16 years, and in 2007, the largest STE plant built in the world since 1991.  It is located in Eldorado Valley in the southwest fringe of Boulder City, Nevada, and was built in that city's Energy Resource Zone, which requires renewable generation as part of plant development permits; Nevada Solar One was approved as part of Duke Energy's larger El Dorado Energy project that built 1 GW of electrical generation capacity. The solar trough generation was built by Acciona Solar Power, a partially owned subsidiary of Spanish conglomerate Acciona Energy.  Lauren Engineers & Constructors (Abilene, TX) was the EPC contractor for the project.  Acciona purchased a 55 percent stake in Solargenix (formerly Duke Solar) and Acciona owns 95 percent of the project. Nevada Solar One is unrelated to the Solar One power plant in California.

History

Nevada Solar One went online for commercial use on June 27, 2007. It uses similar technology and was constructed over a period of 16 months.

Technology
Nevada Solar One uses proprietary technology to track the sun’s location and concentrate its rays during peak demand hours. The plant uses 760 parabolic trough concentrators with more than 182,000 mirrors that concentrate the sun’s rays onto more than 18,240 receiver tubes placed at the focal axis of the troughs and containing a heat transfer fluid (solar receivers). Fluid that heats up to  flows through these tubes and is used to produce steam that drives a Siemens SST-700 steam turbine, adapted to the specific requirements of the CSP technology, which is connected to a generator to produce electricity.

The mirrors are manufactured by Flabeg AG in Germany. In contrast to the power tower concentrator concept that California's original Solar One project uses. The specially coated tubes, made of glass and steel, were designed and produced by Solel Solar Systems as well as by Schott Glass in Germany. Motion control was supplied by Parker Hannifin, from components by Ansco Machine Company.

Solar thermal power plants designed for solar-only generation are well matched to summer noon peak loads in areas with significant cooling demands, such as the southwestern United States. Using thermal energy storage systems, solar thermal operating periods can be extended to meet base load needs. Given Nevada's land and sun resources the state has the theoretical ability to have more than 600 GW of electrical generation capacity using solar thermal concentrators like those used by Nevada Solar One. It has been proposed that massive expansion of solar plants such as Nevada Solar One has the potential to provide sufficient electricity to power the entire United States.

Parabolic concentrator facilities have been successfully operating in California's Mojave Desert commercially since 1984 with a combined generating capacity of 354MW from the Solar Energy Generating Systems. About 30 parabolic trough power plants are operating in Spain (see Solar power in Spain) and more are in construction or proposed, and two 110 MW plants in Israel.

Production 
Nevada Solar One's production is as follows (values in GW·h).

Fossil backup,  night time preservation, and morning pre-heating, is provided by natural gas and provides up to 2% of total output.

See also

 Copper Mountain Solar Facility
 Dish Stirling
 List of solar thermal power stations
 Renewable energy in the United States
 Renewable portfolio standard
 Solar power in Nevada
 Solar power plants in the Mojave Desert
 Solar power tower
 Solar thermal energy

References

 PowerMag: Nevada Solar One, Boulder City, Nevada (12/15/2007)

External links

 Acciona Energy North America's official site
 Largest solar power plant in a generation to be built in Nevada
 Solar Steam at Nevada Solar One

Solar power in the Mojave Desert
Buildings and structures in Boulder City, Nevada
Solar power stations in Nevada
Solar thermal energy
Energy infrastructure completed in 2007